Willie Lee Gaston (born December 15, 1982) is a former American football cornerback. He was originally signed by the Baltimore Ravens as an undrafted free agent in 2007. He played college football at Houston.

Gaston attended Northshore High School in Houston, Texas, and was a letterman in football. In football, he was a starter as a quarterback and was twice named his team's Most Valuable Player.

In 2008 he returned to his alma mater as a teacher and coach. On February 28, 2023 he was named the Head Football Coach of North Shore Senior High School.

External links
Baltimore Ravens bio
Houston Cougars bio

1982 births
Living people
People from Houston
American football cornerbacks
Houston Cougars football players
Baltimore Ravens players